Hypsopygia drabicilialis is a species of snout moth in the genus Hypsopygia. It was described by Hiroshi Yamanaka in 1968. It is found in Japan.

References

Moths described in 1968
Pyralini
Moths of Japan